Hoima International Airport , also Kabaale International Airport, is an airport under construction in Hoima, Uganda. It is part of the infrastructure under construction as Uganda prepares to develop its nascent petroleum industry. When completed, it would be Uganda's second international airport, besides Entebbe International Airport. The new airport is expected to facilitate mobilization of equipment for construction of the Uganda Oil Refinery and assist in the development of agriculture and tourism in Uganda's Western Region.

Location
Hoima Airport is located in Kabaale Parish, Buseruka sub-county, Hoima District in the Western Region of Uganda, near the Kaiso-Tonya oil fields and the Uganda Oil Refinery.

Overview
This airport would be a large international airport capable of handling large passenger and cargo aircraft, sufficient to carry the equipment and staff to develop the Uganda Oil Refinery and the oilfields. The airport's main runway was expected to measure  in length.

As of February 2016, feasibility studies and the impact assessment evaluation were ongoing. Construction was expected to begin in 2017, led by a consortium made up of Colas Limited of the United Kingdom and SBI, a Ugandan construction company.

In January 2018, the UK lenders were identified as Standard Chartered Bank with guarantees from the United Kingdom Export Finance, with the two expected to lend €307 million.

Construction
In February 2018, the government of Uganda selected Shikun & Binui, a construction firm based in Israel to construct this airport, at a cost of US$309 million. The construction which will be undertaken by Solel Boneh International Holdings (SBI), the international arm of Shikun & Binui, is expected to last three years. The scope of work includes (a) paving  of runways (b) carrying out of earthwork and installing drainage infrastructure (c) pouring of cement and asphalt (d) building of electro-mechanical, communications and navigation systems and (e) erection of an air traffic control tower, a cargo terminal, additional residencies and service structures.

SBC Uganda Limited, a joint venture company between Colas Limited of the United Kingdom and SBI International Holdings of Uganda, started construction of the airport in January 2018. The first phase of construction, including the runway and cargo-handling facilities, is expected to be ready in 2020. This phase is primarily to support construction of the oil refinery. The second phase of construction, focused on the facilitation of passengers and boosting tourism and business, is expected to conclude in 2022. The project is expected to create about 1,000 jobs, 30 percent of which are reserved for the local community and the remaining 70 percent reserved for other Ugandans, with a small number taken up by expatriates. Later, the completion of the first phase was pushed back to 2021. As of April 2019, work completed was estimated at 21 percent. In October 2019, completed work had progressed to 31 percent.

In December 2019, it was estimated that 34 percent of the work had been completed. At that time, a total of over 925 workers were employed on the project. Completion was estimated to be in February 2023. In August 2020, completion was estimated at 45 percent. At that time, a total of 830 workers were on the job, with 30 percent recruited from Hoima District. Twenty percent of the workers are female and 98 percent are Ugandan.

As of June 2021, according to the Petroleum Authority of Uganda, as reported by the Daily Monitor, completion had progressed to an estimated 55 percent, with the  runway nearly complete. Commercial commissioning is still planned in February 2023. In August 2021, the airport runway was 95 percent complete. At that time overall work on the airport was estimated at 66 percent complete. Commercial commissioning is anticipated no later than June 2023.

In March 2022, construction progress was estimated at 77 percent complete. The airport's jet fuel depot is expected to receive supplies by road from Kenya and later switch to direct supplies from the Uganda Oil Refinery, when that infrastructure is established.

As of May 2022, the runway was reported at 95 percent complete and the cargo building, passenger terminal, power substation house, ground lighting system, the firefighting house and related facilities were about 79 percent complete.

In October 2022, the EPC contactor, SBC Uganda Limited asked for 10 more months and more money to complete the first phase of construction. At that time, approximately 85 percent of the work was complete and about 80 percent of the budget had been spent. Reasons given for the requested changes included delays attributed to the COVID-19 epidemic, increase of the prices of cement, diesel fuel and gasoline, as a result of the Russo-Ukrainian War. The area was also inundated with heavy rains, further slowing down the progress of construction. A new completion date is reported as December 2023.

See also
 Hoima
 Civil Aviation Authority of Uganda
 List of airports in Uganda

References

External links
 Uganda Civil Aviation Authority Homepage
 Master Plan And Detailed Design For Kabaale International Airport, In Hoima District
 Latest Developments on Construction of Kabaale International Airport in Uganda As of 20 June 2022.

Airports in Uganda
Hoima
Hoima District
Transport in Uganda
Transport infrastructure in Uganda
Proposed airports in Africa
Bunyoro sub-region
Western Region, Uganda
Petroleum infrastructure in Uganda